This is a list of electricity-generating power stations in Alabama, sorted by type and name. In 2019, Alabama had a total summer capacity of 29,256 MW through all of its power plants, and a net generation of 142,679 GWh.  The corresponding electrical energy generation mix was 40.1% natural gas, 30.6% nuclear, 18.7% coal, 8.0% hydroelectric, 2.3% biomass, and 0.3% solar. The state is the second largest hydroelectric producer in the eastern U.S. (after New York), and its Browns Ferry Nuclear Plant is the nation's second largest nuclear generating facility.

Nuclear plants

Fossil-fuel plants

Coal

Natural Gas

Petroleum

Renewable plants
Data from the U.S. Energy Information Administration.

Biomass

 Alabama Pine Pulp
 Alabama River Pulp
 Georgia-Pacific Brewton Mill
 Georgia-Pacific Naheola
 International Paper Pine Hill Mill
 International Paper Prattville Mill
 International Paper Riverdale Mill
 Mead Coated Board
 PCA Jackson Mill
 Sand Valley Power Station
 U.S. Alliance Coosa Mill
 Westervelt Moundville Cogen
 WestRock Demopolis Mill

Hydroelectric

Millers Ferry Lock and Dam
Weiss Hydroelectric Generating Plant
Henry Hydroelectric Generating Plant
Logan Martin Hydroelectric Generating Plant
Lay Hydroelectric Generating Plant
Mitchell Hydroelectric Generating Plant
Jordan Hydroelectric Generating Plant
Bouldin Hydroelectric Generating Plant
Harris Hydroelectric Generating Plant
Martin Hydroelectric Generating Plant
Yates Hydroelectric Generating Plant
Thurlow Hydroelectric Generating Plant
Smith Hydroelectric Generating Plant
Bankhead Hydroelectric Generating Plant
Holt Hydroelectric Generating Plant
Wilson Dam
Guntersville Dam
Wheeler Dam

Solar photovoltaic

Wind
Alabama had no utility-scale wind facilities in 2019.

Utility companies
Tennessee Valley Authority (TVA)
Alabama Power

See also

List of power stations in the United States
List of power stations operated by the Tennessee Valley Authority
List of coal-fired power stations in the United States

References

Energy in Alabama

Alabama
Lists of buildings and structures in Alabama